Lalubhai Babubhai Patel (born 31 August 1955) is an Indian politician, belonging to Bharatiya Janata Party.  He was elected to the Lok Sabha, the lower house of the Parliament of India as a member of the Lok Sabha in the 2009 election and reelected in the 2014 election and 2019 election from the Daman and Diu constituency.

Personal life
Lalubhai Babubhai Patel was born to Shri Babubhai G. Patel & Smt. Chandanben B. Patel and is married to Smt. Taruna L. Patel. He has 1 son(s) 2 daughter(s)

References

External links
 Official biographical sketch in Parliament of India website

India MPs 2009–2014
1955 births
Living people
People from Daman and Diu
People from Daman district, India
Daman and Diu politicians
Lok Sabha members from Daman and Diu
India MPs 2014–2019
Bharatiya Janata Party politicians from Daman and Diu
India MPs 2019–present